Derek Woods (born August 10, 1982 in Winnipeg, Manitoba) is a Canadian composer, living and working in Berlin, Germany.

Biography 
Woods was taking private clarinet and piano lessons in his home city before entering the McGill University in Montreal. He graduated in 2004, being awarded Bachelor of Arts diploma in composition with highest honors. In 2004 he moved to Hanover, Germany, where he was studying at the Hochschule für Musik, Theater und Medien Hannover under Johannes Schöllhorn. He graduated in 2008 and now resides in Berlin.

Performances 
Up to date, Woods' works were performed in various concerts, competitions and festivals in Canada, US, Germany, Belgium, Slovakia, Estonia and other countries. His works were commissioned by Bratislava International Festival, Zydeco Festival, Royal Opera of Wallonia, among others.

In addition to large-scale instrumental compositions Woods has written pieces for clarinet, tuba and piano solo, songs for high and low voices, and music for children. He chooses traditional genres, moderate stylistics and tonal harmonic language.

List of Works

Stage Works
 2009 "Gibsland Love Story", Op.38, commissioned by Zydeco Festival, Opelousas
 2013 "The Hoax", Op.42, commissioned by Royal Opera of Wallonia
 2017 "Mac the Knife", Op.47, commissioned by the Madhatters Ballet Company

Orchestra
 2002 "Symphony No.1", dedicated to Sergei Prokofiev, for chamber orchestra
 2003 "Scherzo", Op.11 for chamber orchestra
 2003 "Concertino", Op.14 for clarinet and chamber orchestra
 2004 "Night in the Zoo", Op.16 for symphony orchestra
 2005 "Clarinet Concerto", Op.25 for clarinet and symphony orchestra
 2006 "Hanover Symphony", Op.26 for symphony orchestra
 2006 "Konzertstück", Op.27 for bass clarinet and symphony orchestra
 2006–2007 "Songs of Chippewa", Op.31 for symphony orchestra. 3rd Prize at the International Composers Competition in Sion, Switzerland, 2008
 2018 "Concerto Gross'o", Op.48 for symphony orchestra

Chamber Ensemble
 1997 "Variations on the Theme from the Motion Picture "Forrest Gump" for clarinet and piano
 1997 "Clowns" for clarinet and piano
 1998 "Andante" for Violin, Clarinet and Piano, later used as 2nd movement for Trio Op.5
 1999 "Variations on the Theme of Paganini", Op.1 for clarinet and piano. Winning piece of the "Young Composers Competition", Montreal, Quebec, 2000
 2000 "Sonata", Op.2 for clarinet and piano
 2000 "Into the Woods!", Op.3 for clarinet, oboe, horn and piano
 2001 "Canadian Suite", Op.4 for violin and piano
 1999–2001 "Trio", Op.5 for violin, clarinet and piano
 2002 "Whazaan", Op.9 for clarinet, bassoon and tuba
 2003 "Tubee or not Tubee", Op.15 for two tubas
 2004 "Rusty", Op.18 for trombone and tuba
 2004–2005 "Suite", Op.20 for brass quintet
 2005 "Variations on a German National Anthem", Op.23 for cello and piano
 2006 "Fairy Tale", Op.28 for mandolin and piano
 2007 "Homeland Fantasy", Op.29 for violin, clarinet and piano. 3rd Prize winner at the Bratislava International Festival, Slovakia, 2009
 2008 "Schützenfest-Suite", Op.33 for brass quintet
 2008 "D.O.P.E.", Op.34 for clarinet and piano
 2008 "Farewell to Friends", Op.36 for clarinet, cello and piano
 2009 "Motzstraße Sketches", Op.37 for flute and piano
 2010 "On Death of the Beloved Mother", Op.41 for clarinet and piano
 2011 "Two Pomo Dances", Op.43 for clarinet quartet, commissioned by Lagniappe Dulcimer Fete, Port Allen, Louisiana
 2011 "To the Fallen", Op.44 for clarinet and piano, commissioned by Macdara O Seireadain and Gintaras Janusevicius
 2013 "Cafe Kröpke", for bayan and chamber ensemble, commissioned by Plathner's Eleven Festival, Hanover

Voice and piano or another instrument
 2002 "No More Britney", Op.10 for soprano and piano
 2003 "Body and Soul", Op.12 for soprano, clarinet and piano
 2004 "Monday", Op.19 for low voice and piano
 2005 "I Hate Pink Carpets", Op.22 for voice, clarinet and piano
 2005 "Three Sonnets", Op.24 on sonnets by William Shakespeare for soprano and piano
 2010 "Where is Maddie?", Op.40 for high soprano, piccolo flute and toy piano
 2013 "Anna Blume", for soprano and bayan, commissioned by Plathner's Eleven Festival, Hanover

Instrument Solo
 1996 "Variations" for piano
 1997 "Serenade" for piano
 1998–1999 "Piano Sonata No.1" for piano
 2001 "Piano Sonata No.2", Op.6 for piano
 2001 "Numb Fingers", Op.7 for piano
 2002–2003 "Etudes for Clarinet Solo", Op.13 for clarinet
 2004 "Piano Sonata No.3", Op.17 for piano
 2005 "Lullaby to the Moon", Op.21 for piano
 2007 "Elegy for Bill Masterton", Op.30 for tuba
 2007 "I is Black", Op.32 for piano left hand
 2010 "Madis' Exam Piece", Op.39 for tuba, commissioned by Madis Vilgats
 2013 "To the Fallen", Op.44b for piano solo, commissioned by Gintaras Janusevicius
 2014 "Dreamcatcher", Op.45 for piano, commissioned by Gintaras Janusevicius
 2015 "Piano Sonata No.4", Op.46 for piano

References 

1982 births
Canadian male composers
Living people
McGill University School of Music alumni
Musicians from Berlin
Musicians from Winnipeg